is a Japanese chemical company manufacturing chemicals, plastics, battery materials, pharmaceuticals, cement, construction materials, and machinery.

The former company name is 

The company was founded in 1897 when Sukesaku Watanabe —an industrialist, a member of the House of Representatives of Japan and a deputy mayor of Ube— established Okinoyama Coal Mine, the predecessor of the present Ube industries.

Since then, the company has established six core business units: Chemicals & plastics, specialty chemicals & products, cement, pharmaceuticals, machinery and metal products, energy and environment.

The company is listed on the Tokyo Stock Exchange and Fukuoka Stock Exchange, and is a constituent of the Nikkei 225 stock index.

Ube Industries is a member of the Mitsubishi UFJ Financial Group (MUFJ) keiretsu.

History
1897:  is established as a silent partnership
1914:  is established as a silent partnership.
1923:   is established.
1933:  is established.
1942: Ube Industries, Ltd. is established through amalgamation of the four foregoing companies.
1993: Capital investment is made in PQM of Spain (now Ube Chemical Europe, S.A.)
1997: Thai Caprolactam Public Co., Ltd. and Ube Nylon (Thailand) Ltd. (now UBE Chemicals（Asia）Public Company Ltd.) open for business.
1998: Ube-Mitsubishi Cement Corporation (joint venture with Mitsubishi Materials Corporation) is established.

Main products

Chemicals and plastics
Caprolactam
Polyamide
Synthetic rubber
Ammonia
Acrylonitrile butadiene styrene
Polyethylene

Speciality chemicals and products
Liquid electrolyte
Diol
dimethyl carbonate
Polyimide
High Purity Silicon Nitride Powder
N2 Separation Membranes

Pharmaceutical
Pharmaceutical materials
Pharmaceutical licenses

Cement and construction materials
Cement
Concrete
Limestone
Magnesia

Energy and environment
Coal

Machinery and metal products
Aluminum wheels
Bridges
Injection molding machines
Die castingmachines

Defense technology
Ube provides advanced materials for various defense and aerospace applications, for example it's Tyranno fiber (a material incorporating a silicon/titanium mix) is used as a stealth material in the X-2 experimental aircraft.

Corporate governance

Board directors
Chairperson and Director
Hiroaki Tamura
President and Representative Director
Michio Takeshita (CEO, also holds the post of vice chairperson of the Japan Chemical Industry Association)
Representative Director
Kazuhiko Okada
Directors
Akinori Furukawa (CCO, General Director of General affairs and Personnel Office)
Makoto Umetsu (General Director of Research and Development)
Yoshiomi Matsumoto (He was vice president of the Industrial Bank of Japan)
Mitsutaka Motoda (He is President of the Sanwa Research Institute and used to be Senior managing director of Sanwa bank)

Locations (UBE Group)

Japan
Tokyo (Headquarter)
Ube (Headquarter, R&D, Plant, Bulk terminal, Limestone mine)
Fukuoka (Sales branch, Plant)
Chiba (R&D, Plant)
Osaka (Plants, Sales branch)
Nagoya (Sales branch)

The presidents of the Ube Chamber of Commerce and Industry are elected from retired persons of The company. Serving president Yasuhisa Chiba (he was Representative Director of Ube industries) also holds the post of vice chairperson of the Chemical Society of Japan.
Some employees of the Ube Group are elected to assemblyman.

Worldwide
Thailand (Sales branch, R&D, Plant)
Spain (Sales branch, R&D, Plant)
Nantong, China (Plant)
U.S. (Sales branch, Plant)
Seoul, South Korea (Sales branch)
Shanghai, China (Sales branch)
Hongkong, China (Sales branch)
Singapore (Sales branch)
Düsseldorf, Germany (Sales branch)
São Paulo, Brazil (Sales branch)
Taiwan (Sales branch)
Mexico City (Sales branch)

etc.

UBE Group is doing business worldwide, especially Thailand(Rayong Province) and Spain(Province of Castellón) are main sites for petrochemical business.
UBE Chemicals(Asia) Public Company Ltd.(UCHA)  is one of the cogent chemical companies in Thailand. The company is the sole caprolactam producer in Thailand. Dr. Charunya Phichitkul, the president of UCHA also holds the post of vice chairperson of the petrochemical Industry Club The Federation of Thai Industries.

See also

Ceramic matrix composite

Gallery

References

External links
UBE global site  
UBE homePage  
UBE In Thailand site 
UBE Latin America Servicos Ltda  
UBE In Europe site
Answers.com UBE Industries

Chemical companies based in Tokyo
Cement companies of Japan
Defense companies of Japan
Companies based in Yamaguchi Prefecture
Manufacturing companies based in Tokyo
Japanese brands
Companies listed on the Tokyo Stock Exchange
Companies listed on the Fukuoka Stock Exchange
Japanese companies established in 1897
Chemical companies established in 1897
Conglomerate companies based in Tokyo
Midori-kai